Travon Marcel Broadway Jr. (born December 2, 1997) is an American professional basketball player for Newcastle Eagles of the British Basketball League. He played college basketball for the St. Petersburg Titans, the Iowa Western CC Reivers, and the Central Michigan Chippewas.

High school career
Broadway attended Coral Springs Christian Academy, playing under coach Gavin Felix. He averaged 20.8 points, 3.1 assists and 7.2 rebounds per game as a senior and was named to the 2016 All-Broward County second team. Broadway did a postgraduate season at Washington Academy in Greenville, North Carolina.

College career
Broadway played for St. Petersburg College during his freshman season and averaged 14.2 points and 6.1 rebounds per game. He subsequently played his sophomore season for Iowa Western Community College. As a sophomore, he averaged 16.6 points and 4.3 rebounds per game. Following the season, Broadway transferred to Central Michigan. He averaged 7.1 points and 2.8 rebounds per game as a junior. As a senior, Broadway averaged 17.9 points, 5.4 rebounds, and 1.8 assists per game. His season was cut short by injuries and he chose not to take advantage of the additional year of eligibility granted by the NCAA due to the COVID-19 pandemic.

Professional career
On July 22, 2021, Broadway signed his first professional contract with KK TFT of the Macedonian First League. He averaged 9.8 points, 3.5 rebounds, and 1.4 steals per game. On January 3, 2022, Broadway signed with KK Kožuv.

Career statistics

College

NCAA Division I

|-
| style="text-align:left;"| 2019–20
| style="text-align:left;"| Central Michigan
| 32 || 14 || 20.7 || .388 || .312 || .658 || 2.8 || 1.1 || 1.1 || .1 || 7.1
|-
| style="text-align:left;"| 2020–21
| style="text-align:left;"| Central Michigan
| 18 || 18 || 29.9 || .465 || .370 || .720 || 5.4 || 1.8 || 1.7 || .1 || 17.9
|- class="sortbottom"
| style="text-align:center;" colspan="2"| Career
| 50 || 32 || 24.0 || .429 || .340 || .695 || 3.8 || 1.3 || 1.3 || .1 || 11.0

JUCO

|-
| style="text-align:left;"| 2017–18
| style="text-align:left;"| St. Petersburg
| 28 || 10 || 23.8 || .467 || .279 || .761 || 6.1 || 1.7 || 2.1 || .1 || 14.2
|-
| style="text-align:left;"| 2018–19
| style="text-align:left;"| Iowa Western CC
| 30 || 28 || 19.5 || .450 || .311 || .733 || 4.3 || 2.7 || 1.7 || .2 || 16.6
|- class="sortbottom"
| style="text-align:center;" colspan="2"| Career
| 58 || 38 || 21.6 || .458 || .299 || .745 || 5.2 || 2.2 || 1.9 || .1 || 15.4

References

External links
Central Michigan Chippewas bio
Iowa Western CC Reivers bio
St. Petersburg Titans bio

1997 births
Living people
American expatriate basketball people in North Macedonia
American men's basketball players
Basketball players from Florida
Central Michigan Chippewas men's basketball players
Iowa Western Reivers men's basketball players
People from Coral Springs, Florida
Shooting guards
St. Petersburg College alumni